Miles Benjamin Anthony Robinson (born October 30, 1982 in Oregon) is a Brooklyn-based singer-songwriter.

Biography
Miles was raised in Portland and Eugene. He spent much of his youth on the road traveling with his comedian/playwright father as he played venues across the U.S.  In high school, he began playing guitar and writing songs.  After a brief move to California, Miles went to New York City in 2000. He attended New York University and graduated from Tisch School of the Arts in 2004.

Musical career
Miles's eponymous first LP, originally recorded, produced and arranged in 2006 with Chris Taylor of Grizzly Bear, was released on July 1, 2008.  The album features contributions by Grizzly Bear's Daniel Rossen and Christopher Bear and TV on the Radio's Kyp Malone.

Miles signed with Saddle Creek Records on August 12, 2009. His second LP Summer Of Fear was produced by Malone and released on October 20, 2009. The same year Miles was chosen as one of Beyond Race Magazine'''s "50 Emerging Artists", resulting in a spot in their #11 issue as well as a full-length Q&A on their website.

Miles has not yet released further albums under his own name, but since 2017 has been in the duo Drug Couple with his partner Becca Robinson.Song Premiere: '2027' by Drug Couple

Solo discographyMiles Benjamin Anthony Robinson (Say Hey Records, 2008)Summer Of Fear'' (Saddle Creek Records, 2009)

References

External links

 [ AllMusic]
 
 
 Miles Benjamin Anthony Robinson on Myspace (archive)
 Spin Magazine Article

American singer-songwriters
Living people
1982 births
Musicians from Oregon
Tisch School of the Arts alumni
21st-century American singers
Saddle Creek Records artists